Restored, Returned is an album by Norwegian jazz pianist and composer Tord Gustavsen Ensemble recorded in 2009 and released on the ECM label.

Reception 
The Guardian review by John Fordham awarded the album 4 stars. The All About Jazz reviewer John Kelman stated: Gustavsen continues to be a marvel of economical invention, a player who speaks little but says much. Restored, Returned is a logical extension/expansion on his previous ECM releases, as his nuanced, tender playing eschews stereotypical references to Norwegian music as icy or cool, even as "The Way In" cinematically traverses imaginary bodies of water explored regularly by pianist Ketil Bjørnstad. But with more colors at his disposal and a greater attention to song form—even as the result feels somehow freer—Gustavsen has shaped an album even more appealing in its subtle but unmistakable experimentation[.]

Track listing

 "The Child Within" (3:48)
 "Way In" (4:29)
 "Lay Your Sleeping Head, My Love" (2:50)
 "Spiral Song" (4:01)
 "Restored, Returned" (5:55)
 "Left Over Lullaby No. 2" (4:44)
 "The Swirl/Wrapped In a Yielding Air" (5:23)
 "Left Over Lullaby No. 1/O Stand, Stand At the Window" (7:18)
 "Your Crooked Heart" (3:41)
 "The Gaze" (5:39)
 "Left Over Lullaby No. 3" (3:04)

Personnel 
Tord Gustavsen - piano
Kristin Asbjørnsen - vocals (tracks: 3-8, 11)
Tore Brunborg - tenor saxophone (tracks: 4-8, 10) & soprano saxophone (track: 1)
Mats Eilertsen - double bass (tracks: 2-10)
Jarle Vespestad - drums (tracks: 2-10)

Credits 
Design – Sascha Kleis
Engineer – Jan Erik Kongshaug
Cover photography – Jan Fricke
Liner photos – Hans Fredrik Asbjørnsen
Producer – Manfred Eicher
Words By – W. H. Auden (tracks: 3, 5, 7, 8)

Notes 
All compositions by Tord Gustavsen
Lyrics in tracks 3, 5, 7 & 7 are from Auden's "Another Time"
Recorded in January 2009 at Rainbow Studio, Oslo
Producer Manfred Eicher at ECM Records

References 

ECM Records albums
Tord Gustavsen albums
2009 albums
Albums produced by Manfred Eicher